Charlotte's bulbul (Iole charlottae) is a species of songbird in the bulbul family, Pycnonotidae.
It is found on Borneo in its natural habitat of subtropical or tropical moist lowland forests.
It is threatened by habitat loss.

Taxonomy and systematics
Charlotte's bulbul was originally described in the genus Criniger. It was split from the buff-vented bulbul by the IOC in 2017.

References

Iole (genus)
Endemic birds of Borneo
Birds of East Malaysia
Birds described in 1867
Taxa named by Otto Finsch